Nice Plaza is a shopping center in East District, Chiayi City, Taiwan that opened in 2006. It is the largest shopping mall in Chiayi City.

History
 In April 2006, the Nice Plaza building was completed.
 On August 22, 2009, Fubon Life Insurance Co., Ltd. announced the purchase of the property rights of Nice Plaza (including department stores and restaurants) from Jianhushan World Company for NT$4.3 billion.

Facilities
Nice Plaza Shopping Center opened in October 2006. It is the largest department store with the highest annual revenue in the city. When it opened in 2006, it cooperated with Japan’s Matsuya Department Store, so it was not called Nice Plaza Shopping Center, but named Nice Matsuya Fashion Department Store. At that time, the department store business floors ranged from the first basement floor to the fourth floor above the ground and the front building five floors above the ground. The brands included beauty, men’s and women’s shoes, boutiques, clothing, accessories, household appliances, daily necessities, bedding and furnishings, kitchen supplies, and specialty products as well as themed restaurants and food courts. In 2015, Nice Matsuya Fashion Department Store was renamed to Nice Plaza Fashion Department Store. In 2017, it was renamed to Nice Plaza Shopping Center again.

See also
 List of tourist attractions in Taiwan
 Showtime Live Chiayi

References

External links

2006 establishments in Taiwan
Shopping malls in Chiayi City
Shopping malls established in 2006
Buildings and structures in Chiayi